On One is the 9th studio solo album released by rapper, Keak da Sneak.

Track listing
"The O" – 4:36
"Same O Thang" – 5:02
"Get Doe" – 3:58
"High Tonight" – 4:44
"Street Stars" – 4:08
"Playa Ass Nigga's" – 3:01 
"Get It Started" – 4:39 
"Soldierz" – 6:23 (Featuring Yukmouth)
"Like What" – 4:14 (Featuring The Delinquents)
"Fuck with These Hoe's" – 4:13 
"Full Circle" – 4:32 (Featuring Kurupt)

2005 albums
Keak da Sneak albums